Colwich is a city in Sedgwick County, Kansas, United States, located northwest of Wichita.  As of the 2020 census, the population of the city was 1,455.

History
Colwich was founded in 1887. The name is a portmanteau of Colorado and Wichita, or the Colorado & Wichita Railroad.

Geography
Colwich is located at  (37.780480, -97.540420). It is northwest of Wichita and centered around the intersection of 53rd St North and 167th St West.

Demographics

Colwich is part of the Wichita, KS Metropolitan Statistical Area.

2010 census
As of the census of 2010, there were 1,327 people, 466 households, and 348 families living in the city. The racial makeup of the city was 97.4% White, 0.2% African American, 0.5% Native American, 1.1% from other races, and 0.9% from two or more races. Hispanic or Latino of any race were 2.5% of the population.

There were 466 households, of which 44.6% had children under the age of 18 living with them, 59.7% were married couples living together, 9.9% had a female householder with no husband present, 5.2% had a male householder with no wife present, and 25.3% were non-families. 22.3% of all households were made up of individuals, and 10.7% had someone living alone who was 65 years of age or older. The average household size was 2.85 and the average family size was 3.38.

The median age in the city was 32.7 years. 34.3% of residents were under the age of 18; 7.7% were between the ages of 18 and 24; 25.9% were from 25 to 44; 21.1% were from 45 to 64; and 11.1% were 65 years of age or older. The gender makeup of the city was 50.1% male and 49.9% female.

2000 census
As of the census of 2000, there were 1,229 people, 376 households, and 315 families living in the city. The racial makeup of the city was 98.62% White, 0.57% Asian, 0.24% from other races, and 0.57% from two or more races. Hispanic or Latino of any race were 0.81% of the population.

There were 376 households, out of which 47.3% had children under the age of 18 living with them, 69.9% were married couples living together, 9.0% had a female householder with no husband present, and 16.2% were non-families. 14.9% of all households were made up of individuals, and 8.0% had someone living alone who was 65 years of age or older. The average household size was 3.13 and the average family size was 3.49.

In the city, the population was spread out, with 34.9% under the age of 18, 6.8% from 18 to 24, 27.9% from 25 to 44, 14.5% from 45 to 64, and 15.9% who were 65 years of age or older. The median age was 32 years. For every 100 females, there were 99.2 males. For every 100 females age 18 and over, there were 91.8 males.

The median income for a household in the city was $51,346, and the median income for a family was $58,068. Males had a median income of $41,667 versus $28,676 for females. The per capita income for the city was $19,588. About 2.0% of families and 2.3% of the population were below the poverty line, including 2.9% of those under age 18 and 1.4% of those age 65 or over.

Education
The community is served by Renwick USD 267 public school district.

References

Further reading

External links

 City of Colwich
 Colwich - Directory of Public Officials
 Colwich city map, KDOT

Cities in Kansas
Cities in Sedgwick County, Kansas
Wichita, KS Metropolitan Statistical Area
1887 establishments in Kansas
Populated places established in 1887